Cristian Ezequiel Ramírez (born 29 March 1995) is an Argentine professional footballer who plays as a midfielder, recently for Slovak club AS Trenčín.

Career
Ramírez began in the youth system of Argentine Primera División team Lanús, he was selected to represent the U20s at the 2016 U-20 Copa Libertadores in Paraguay; subsequently scoring three  goals in five matches as Lanús finished fourth. On 20 July 2017, Ramírez joined fellow Primera División side Talleres on loan. His professional and Talleres debut came during a 5–2 victory over his parent club Lanús on 26 August. Ahead of the 2019–20 campaign, Ramírez switched Argentina for Greece after agreeing terms with Football League side Thesprotos. He scored four goals in twenty appearances in his first season.

Career statistics
.

References

External links

1995 births
Living people
Sportspeople from Buenos Aires Province
Argentine footballers
Argentine expatriate footballers
Expatriate footballers in Greece
Argentine expatriate sportspeople in Greece
Expatriate footballers in Slovakia
Argentine expatriate sportspeople in Slovakia
Association football midfielders
Argentine Primera División players
Football League (Greece) players
Club Atlético Lanús footballers
Talleres de Córdoba footballers
Thesprotos F.C. players
AS Trenčín players
Slovak Super Liga players